is a Japanese anime television series directed by Shinichi Watanabe and animated by Shaft. It aired on Animax from November 26, 2000, to May 29, 2001, and was produced by Animax and Genco.

Plot 
The series revolves around a boy named Koni, who is the center of attention. He can be whatever he wants, a lifeguard, a fireman, a samurai, or an astronaut. He is the luckiest boy in the whole world, and everything goes well for him. Koni always lives crazy adventures with his friends High, Moro and Nari, and his dog Afro.

Characters 
: The main character, an oversized boy. He is modeled after sumo wrestler Konishiki Yasokichi.

High: A high-spirited boy whose spiky hair catches fire every time he gets excited.

Moro: A girl with pink hair held in pigtails. She thinks of herself as the "sex symbol" of the show.

Nari: A boy who wears glasses. He believes everything can be solved with money, and is a lover of everything that is round, including Koni himself (just for being round). He lives in a round mansion.

Afro: Koni's talking pet dog. As his name implies, he has an afro.

Lovely-sensei: Koni, High, Moro and Nari's teacher. One day she fell in love with Koni, and because of this she always chases him.

Emi: An android girl with a TV for a head. Named after the company Toshiba-EMI.

Pesome: A green hand puppet.

External links
 

2000 anime television series debuts
Animax original programming
Anime with original screenplays
Comedy anime and manga
Shaft (company)